William Parker Shadoan (December 8, 1894 – June 20, 1974) was an American football, basketball, and baseball coach and military officer.  He served as head football, basketball, and baseball coach at Valparaiso University during the 1923–24 and 1924–25 academic years.  Shadoan attended Centre College in Danville, Kentucky, where he played college football as a guard on the 1921 Centre Praying Colonels football team.  He served in the United States Army during the Pancho Villa Expedition and with the American Expeditionary Forces in France during World War I.  He reached the rank of colonel and later served as the superintendent of a number of military schools.

Head coaching record

Football

References

External links
 

1894 births
1974 deaths
American football guards
Centre Colonels football players
Valparaiso Beacons football coaches
Valparaiso Beacons men's basketball coaches
United States Army personnel of World War I
United States Army officers
People from Somerset, Kentucky
Coaches of American football from Kentucky
Players of American football from Kentucky
Basketball coaches from Kentucky